Canlan Ice Sports Etobicoke is a four-pad hockey facility located at Ontario Highway 409 and Martin Grove Road in Etobicoke, Toronto, Ontario, Canada. The arena is owned and operated by Canlan Ice Sports Corporation, of Burnaby, British Columbia. Canlan Ice Sports Corporation is a publicly traded company on the Toronto Stock Exchange with the call letters ICE.

The arena is home to The Toronto Marlboros Minor Hockey Organization, a member of the Greater Toronto Hockey League (GTHL). The Dixie Beehives of the Ontario Junior Hockey League played here from 2009 to 2011.

The facility was a Gold Award winner of the 2007 Toronto Sun Readers' Choice Award in the category of the Recreational Hockey Arena.

References

Etobicoke
Ice hockey venues in Toronto
Sports venues in Toronto